Paopi 23 - Coptic Calendar - Paopi 25

The twenty-fourth day of the Coptic month of Paopi, the second month of the Coptic year. On a common year, this day corresponds to October 21, of the Julian Calendar, and November 3, of the Gregorian Calendar. This day falls in the Coptic season of Peret, the season of emergence.

Commemorations

Saints 

 The martyrdom of Saint Paul, Saint Longinus, and Saint Deenah 
 The departure of Saint Hilarion, the Monk

References 

Days of the Coptic calendar